Sparrow of the Circus is a 1914 American silent short drama film based on a story by M.H. McKinstry.  It was said to be: "Pathetic tale of the ring and the elopement of the clown's wife with a rascally ring master [Jackson Crane].  Sparrow is comforted by his friend Pantaloon and shows no sign of his secret grief.  His brave patience and the love of his child bring about a touching reunion."   Its release was for six months.

Cast
 Reaves Eason
 Jack Richardson
 Vivian Rich
 Harry von Meter
 Billie O'Brien

References

Notes

Citations

External links

1914 films
1914 drama films
Silent American drama films
American silent short films
American black-and-white films
1914 short films
1910s American films